Yazdeh Rud (also Romanized as Yazdeh Rūd, Yazdakhrud, and Yezdehrūd; also known as Yazdrūd) is a village in Qaqazan-e Gharbi Rural District, in the Central District of Takestan County, Qazvin Province, Iran. At the 2006 census, its population was 170, in 50 families.

References 

Populated places in Takestan County